Gonzalo Guijarro Rodríguez (born 1 January 1996) is a Spanish footballer who plays for Gibraltarian club Gibraltar United FC. Mainly a central defender, he can also play as a left back.

Club career
Born in Madridejos, Toledo, Castile-La Mancha, Gonzalo finished his formation with Levante UD. On 18 July 2015 he moved to Tercera División side CD Madridejos, but after failing to make an appearance for the side, he subsequently moved to CD Villacañas in the regional leagues.

In 2016 Gonzalo joined CD Toledo, club he already represented as a youth, and was assigned to the reserves also in the fourth level. On 23 June of the following year, he signed for another reserve team, AD Alcorcón B in the same division.

Gonzalo made his first team debut on 7 September 2017, starting in a 2–4 home loss against Cultural y Deportiva Leonesa, for the season's Copa del Rey. On 3 July of the following year, he moved abroad for the first time in his career after signing for Gibraltar United FC.

References

External links

Fútbol Manchego profile 

1996 births
Living people
Sportspeople from the Province of Toledo
Spanish footballers
Footballers from Castilla–La Mancha
Association football defenders
Tercera División players
AD Alcorcón B players
AD Alcorcón footballers
Gibraltar United F.C. players